Siófok-Kiliti Airfield  is a recreational aerodrome serving Siófok, the capital of Lake Balaton, Hungary.

Facilities

References

External links
 LHSK - Siófok-Kiliti Airport
 LHSK

Airports in Hungary
Buildings and structures in Somogy County
Lake Balaton